Slangerup Church or St Michael's Church is an Evangelical Lutheran church located in the centre of Slangerup, Frederikssund Municipality, Denmark.

History and description

Slangerup Church in its current form was completed in 1588 by architect Hans van Steenwinckel the Elder and master builder Jørgen van Friborg. Another church is mentioned on the site, presumed reused for the building of Slangerup Church.

Restoration of interior

External links
  Home page 
  
  
  

Churches in the Capital Region of Denmark
Buildings and structures in Frederikssund Municipality
16th-century Lutheran churches
Lutheran churches in Europe
Religious buildings and structures completed in 1588
Churches in the Diocese of Helsingør
16th-century churches in Denmark